The United States Olympic team trials for the sport of wrestling are contested quadrennially to determine the country's representative at the Summer Olympic Games on each style (men's and women's freestyle and Greco-Roman) and weight class. The event is conducted by the national governing body of the sport, currently USA Wrestling.

Standards 
To represent the United States at the Summer Olympic Games, an American wrestler must qualify nationally by winning the US Olympic team trials tournament, and internationally, by either placing fifth or higher at the previous year's World Championships or by becoming a finalist at the Pan American Olympic Qualifier or at a World Olympic Qualifier. The athlete who qualifies their weight class for the Summer Olympics is not guaranteed of a spot in the team, as he must qualify nationally. In case of an athlete qualifying nationally but failing to qualify the weight class internationally, the United States will not be represented at the Games.

History 
The first edition of the US Olympic team trials for wrestling took place from June 16 to 23 of 1984, when USA Wrestling dictated they would no longer select the wrestlers they sent to the Summer Olympic Games or the World Championships, as they would now hold an event where qualifying would now be on the hands of the athletes. Bob Dellinger, tournament operations director for the organization, expressed:

Editions

References 

Wrestling competitions
Recurring sporting events established in 1984
Wrestling competitions in the United States
Wrestling
1984 establishments in the United States